The 2020 Liga Dominicana de Fútbol was the sixth season of the LDF. This most important soccer tournament in the country, organized by the Dominican Soccer Federation Dominican Football Federation, would begin in the second week of March, but was postponed due to the COVID-19 pandemic. 10 teams participated in the competition. The game mode was in three phases (Regular Phase – Liguilla Phase – Play-off Phase).

On September 24, the change of format to the group stage was announced, which began on October 9. It was scheduled to end on December 13.

The Liga Dominicana de Futbol tournament is made up of two parts:
  'Group stage:' A group stage system will be played divided into 2 circuits: '''North Circuit and 'South Circuit' . Each team will play a total of 6 matches in their respective circuit in their own field and in the opposite field. The first place of each circuit will qualify directly to the semifinals, while the second and third place of each circuit will qualify for the playoffs.

 Competition system 

The order of classification of the teams will be determined in a general calculation table, as follows:

 Higher number of points;
 Greater goal difference in favor; in case of equality;
 Higher number of goals scored; in case of equality;
 Highest number of away goals scored; in case of equality;
 Less amount of red cards received; in case of equality;
 Less quantity of yellow cards received; in case of equality;
 Draw.

  'Final phase:''' An elimination system will be played, in which the teams classified to the repechage will play a single match, the winners will play against those directly classified to the semifinals in two games, and the winners of this will play the Grand Final 'two-legged.

 Classification for international competitions 

The champion and runner-up of the 'Grand Final will have a place in the CFU Club Championship

Participating Teams 
A total of 8 teams will compete in the 2020 Tournament.

Teams by Province

Team Information

 The Atlético San Francisco and Moca FC were not included.

North Circuit

South Circuit

Play-offs

References

External links 
 Equipos de la LDF 2020

Football in the Dominican Republic
Liga Dominicana de Fútbol seasons
Dominican Republic
Dominican Republic
2020s in Dominican Republic sport
Association football events postponed due to the COVID-19 pandemic
2020 in the Dominican Republic